Edward Campbell (1890–1949) was a Jersey politician who won the 1940 Jersey local elections for Saint Ouen, Jersey parish.

Elections were held in Jersey on 30 August 1940. The island was occupied by the Germans from 1 July 1940 until the surrender of the German forces on 9 May 1945. During this time, there was one election, held soon after the occupation began. The result installed Campbell as a puppet of the German administration, which was centered around the department of Manche, a French department in Normandy. He won 70% of the vote against Thomas Jenkins.

The election was unique in that only two candidates stood to represent the entire island. The post was abolished it in 1942.

References

1890 births
1949 deaths
Jersey politicians